Angus Gordon Davidson (born 2 October 1948) is a Scottish former professional footballer who played as a midfielder.

References

1948 births
Living people
People from Forfar
Scottish footballers
Association football midfielders
Grimsby Town F.C. players
Scunthorpe United F.C. players
Winterton Rangers F.C. players
English Football League players
Footballers from Angus, Scotland